1984–85 was the 38th season of the Western International Hockey League.

The Spokane Chiefs were named the 1984-85 Champions of the WIHL and advanced to play in the 1984-85 Western Canada Allan Cup Playoffs.

Standings
 Spokane Chiefs			40		34	 4	 2				279	130		 70
 Nelson Maple Leafs 		40		22	16	 2				217	166		 46
 Elk Valley Blazers		40		17	20	 3				176	196		 37
 Kimberley Dynamiters		40		10	26	 4				158	250		 24
 Cranbrook Royals		40		11	28	 1				182	267		 23

Playoffs

Semi-finals
On Tuesday March 12, 1985, the Spokane Chiefs completed their four-game sweep of the hometown Kimberly Dynamites with a final score of 15-5. Gordie McKay scored four goals, with Bob Scurfield, Bruce Cullen and Gary Harpell scoring two goals apiece for the regular season champion Chiefs. The Chiefs won the best-of-seven Savage Cup semi-final series with scores of 8-1, 6-2, 11-2 and 15-5.

In the other series, the Nelson Maple Leafs defeated the Elk Valley Blazers four games to three in a series that went the full seven games.

The Spokane Chiefs and the Nelson Maple Leafs advanced to the Savage Cup final for the Western International Hockey League playoff championship and the right to compete in the Patton Cup playoffs for the Western Canada senior amateur title.

Final
In the best-of-seven final, the Spokane Chiefs defeated Nelson Maple Leafs four games to one to win the Savage Cup. The Spokane Chiefs advanced to the 1984-85 Western Canada Allan Cup Playoffs.

References

Spokane Chronicle - November 29, 1984

Western International Hockey League seasons
WIHL
WIHL